Pilostemon is a genus of Asian plants in the thistle tribe within the daisy family.

 Species
 Pilostemon filifolia (C.Winkl.) Iljin - Altay, Kazakhstan, Uzbekistan, Xinjiang, Kyrgyzstan
 Pilostemon karategini (Lipsky) Iljin - Kazakhstan, Uzbekistan, Xinjiang, Kyrgyzstan, Iran, Afghanistan

References

Asteraceae genera
Cynareae